Charles Tremblay (August 15, 1930 – May 1, 2002) was an American skier. He competed in the Nordic combined event at the 1956 Winter Olympics.

References

External links
 

1930 births
2002 deaths
American male Nordic combined skiers
Olympic Nordic combined skiers of the United States
Nordic combined skiers at the 1956 Winter Olympics
People from Lebanon, New Hampshire